Namoroka National Park, formerly known as Tsingy de Namoroka Strict Nature Reserve, is a national park located in the northwestern part of Madagascar in the Mahajanga Province, specifically, the Soalala District.

History 
Namoroka Strict Nature Reserve was established in 1927 and became a special reserve in 1966. It forms a complex with the neighboring Baie de Baly National Park.

Climate and geography 

The park is known for its tsingy walls, caves, canyons, and natural swimming pools.

Fauna 
Like much of Madagascar, Namoroka is known for its abundant and diverse wildlife. Of its over 81 species of birds, 31 are endemic to Madagascar with 23 other species endemic to Madagascar and other neighboring islands.

Namoroka is also home to over 30 species of reptiles, five types of frogs, and 16 mammals, including eight lemurs. Specifically, Namoroka is home to the following lemur species:
 Von der Decken's sifaka
 Red lemur
 Eastern lesser bamboo lemur
 Masoala fork-crowned lemur
 Gray mouse lemur
 Milne-Edwards' sportive lemur
 Fat-tailed dwarf lemur
 Aye-aye

See also
List of national parks of Madagascar
Baie de Baly National Park
Marosakabe cave system

References

External links
 World Database on Protected Areas entry
 Wild Madagascar's entry on Namoroka

Mahajanga Province
National parks of Madagascar
Protected areas established in 1927
IUCN Category II
Boeny
Madagascar dry deciduous forests
Important Bird Areas of Madagascar